Jan Erik Hobæk Weber (born 20 March 1944) is a Norwegian oceanographer.

He was born in Gjerpen. He took the dr.philos. degree in 1974, became a professor of physical oceanography at the University of Oslo in 1979 and a fellow of the Norwegian Academy of Science and Letters in 1988.

He resides at Østerås.

References

1944 births
Living people
People from Skien
Academic staff of the University of Oslo
Norwegian oceanographers
Members of the Norwegian Academy of Science and Letters